Maloja is a village in the Swiss canton of Grisons. It is part of the municipality of Bregaglia.

It is located at the western end of Lake Sils, near the summit of the Maloja Pass.

Since 1884 it boasts the luxury hotel Maloja Palace.

Bibliography

References

Engadin
Bregaglia
Villages in Graubünden